Itwara Central Forest Reserve is a body of medium altitude moist semi-deciduous forest in the Kyenjojo District, western Uganda. It is 87 km2 in size and is partly used as protection and production forest area by the NFA. 258 plant species have been identified within the forest of which trees compose 248. A group of 120 chimpanzees has been reported living there. Seven species are endemic to this eco-region and 10 are threatened.
Bordering the forests are tea plantations and communities living from subsistence agriculture. Problems in the past have been poaching and encroachment in the northern part of the reserve.

References

Forests of Uganda
Forest reserves of Uganda
Protected areas of Uganda